Cupid.com is one of the oldest online dating websites targeted at the United States, UK, Australia, and Canada markets. The founders claim that the website has more than 8 million users.

History

Cupid.com began with its launch in the United Kingdom on July 2002. The website was initially owned by Cupid plc, and then sold to Grendall Investment Limited in 2013 for £45.1 million.

Wingman Barney

In 2015, Cupid.com launched a brand new feature to the online dating world called Wingman Barney. This is a virtual wingman that helps users start an anonymous conversation with those they like. If the addressee likes the person who is introduced by Wingman Barney and agrees to meet the sender, Cupid's wingman presents them with lifetime free private communication.

Redesign

In June 2016, the website was totally redesigned and rebranded. New features such as Quiz-matching and Likebook were introduced, along with a refreshed user interface.

References

2002 establishments in the United Kingdom
Online dating services of the United Kingdom